The 2020 Kentucky Wildcats football team represented the University of Kentucky in the 2020 NCAA Division I FBS football season. The Wildcats played their home games at Kroger Field in Lexington, Kentucky, and competed in the East Division of the Southeastern Conference (SEC). They were led by eighth-year head coach Mark Stoops.

Preseason

SEC Media Days
In the preseason media poll, Kentucky was predicted to finish in fourth place in the East Division.

Schedule
Kentucky had games scheduled against Eastern Illinois, Eastern Michigan, Kent State,  and Louisville, which were all canceled due to the COVID-19 pandemic. This will be the first season since 1993 that the Wildcats do not play Louisville. As of 10/16/2020, the SEC swapped two teams and the dates of when they will play the Wildcats. This is because of an outbreak of COVID-19 among other competing SEC football teams. Missouri will be an away game on October 24, instead of an away game on the 31st and Georgia, at home, on October 31 instead of the 24th.

Rankings

Game summaries

at Auburn

Ole Miss

Mississippi State

Tennessee

Missouri

Georgia

Players drafted into the NFL

References

Kentucky
Kentucky Wildcats football seasons
Gator Bowl champion seasons
Kentucky Wildcats football